Marek Bieńczyk (born 6 July 1956) is a Polish writer, historian of literature, translator, essayist and oenologist. In 2012, he won the Nike Award, Poland's top literary prize, for his collection of essays Book of Faces.

Life and career
Born in 1956 in Milanówek, Poland, he studied Romance Languages and Literature at the University of Warsaw and has worked as a historian at the Institute of Literary Research of the Polish Academy of Sciences (PAN). He is also a visiting professor at the Jagiellonian University in Kraków. He has collaborated with the Tygodnik Powszechny, and the French quarterly L'Atelier du roman. He specializes in Polish literary Romanticism and contemporary French literature. His academic debut was published in 1990 and was titled Czarny człowiek. Zygmunt Krasiński wobec śmierci (The Black Man – Zygmunt Krasiński on Death).

In 1999, his book Tworki won Paszport Polityki and a year later was awarded the Władysław Reymont Literary Prize. In 2012, he received the Nike Award for his collection of essays Książka twarzy (Book of Faces), the title of which ironically alludes to the social networking service Facebook. In 2013, he was awarded the Illustrated Book of the Year Award (Polish national section of IBBY) for his book Książe w cukierni (Prince in a Cake Shop). In 2019, he was nominated for another Nike Award for his book Kontener.

He is also known as a translator of French-language literature, most notably the works of Milan Kundera (Immortality, Slowness, Identity, The Festival of Insignificance), Emil Cioran and Roland Barthes.

His books have been translated into several languages including Bulgarian, Czech, English, French, German, Hungarian, Spanish and Ukrainian.
 
He is a member of the Federation of Wine and Spirits Journalists and Writers (FIJEV) and collaborates with the Kraków-based Collegium Vini. He has published articles on wine in such newspapers and magazines as Gazeta Wyborcza, Przekrój, Forbes, Magazyn Wino and Kuchnia. Together with Wojciech Bońkowski, he co-wrote Poland's first oenological guide called Wina Europy (Wines of Europe).

Selected works
Terminal, Państwowy Instytut Wydawniczy, Warsaw, 1994
Tworki, Wydawnictwo Sic!, Warsaw, 1999

Collections of essays
Czarny człowiek. Krasiński wobec śmierci, Literary Research Institute PAN, Warsaw, 1990
Szybko i szybciej – eseje o pośpiechu w kulturze, Warsaw, 1996
Melancholia. O tych co nigdy nie odnajdą straty, Wydawnictwo Sic!, Warsaw, 1998
Oczy Dürera. O melancholii romantycznej, Wydawnictwo Sic!, Warsaw, 2002 
Przezroczystość, Wydawnictwo Znak, Kraków, 2007
Książka twarzy, Świat książki – Weltbild Polska, Warsaw, 2011
Jabłko Olgi, stopy Dawida, Wielka Litera, Warsaw, 2015
Kontener, Wielka Litera, Warsaw, 2018

See also
Polish literature
List of Polish writers

References

Living people
1956 births
Polish writers
Polish literary historians
Polish essayists
Polish translators
Nike Award winners
People from Milanówek
University of Warsaw alumni